Agaricus aurantioviolaceus is a species of fungus in the genus Agaricus. Found in Africa, it was originally named as a species of Psalliota by mycologist Roger Heim in 1968. It was transferred to Agaricus in 1994. The mushroom is suspected to be poisonous.

See also
List of Agaricus species

References

auranteoviolaceus
Fungi described in 1968
Fungi of Africa